Xylooligosaccharides (XOS) are polymers of the sugar xylose. They are produced from the xylan fraction in plant fiber. Their C5 (where C is a quantity of carbon atoms in each monomer) structure is fundamentally different from other prebiotics, which are based upon C6 sugars. Xylooligosaccharides have been commercially available since the 1980s, originally produced by Suntory in Japan. They have more recently become more widely available commercially, as technologies have advanced and production costs have fallen. Some enzymes from yeast can exclusively convert xylan into only xylooligosaccharides-DP-3 to 7.

Xylooligosaccharides act as a prebiotic, selectively feeding beneficial bacteria such as bifidobacteria and lactobacilli within the digestive tract. A large number of clinical trials have been conducted with XOS, demonstrating a variety of health benefits, including improvements in blood sugars and lipids, digestive health benefits, laxation, and beneficial changes to immune markers. These health benefits have typically been observed at 1–4 g/d, a lower dose than required for prebiotics such as fructooligosaccharides and inulin.

See also
  (FOS)
  (GOS)
  (IMO)

References

 
 
 
 
 
 
 
 
 
 
 
 
 
 

Oligosaccharides